Araz is a village and  municipality in the Babek District of Nakhchivan, Azerbaijan. It is located on the left bank of the Aras River. Its population is busy with gardening, grain growing and animal husbandry. There is a secondary school in the village. It has a population of 246.

References

 

Populated places in Babek District